Barış is a Turkish word meaning "peace" and a given name for males. People named Barış include:

 Barış Akarsu (1979–2007), Turkish rock musician
 Barış Arduç (born 1987), Turkish actor
 Barış Ermiş (born 1985), Turkish basketball player
 Barış Esen (born 1986), Turkish Grand Master of chess.
 Barış Eyriboz (born 1976), Turkish film director
 Barış Hamaz (born 1976), Turkish volleyball player
 Barış Hersek (born 1988), Turkish basketball player
 Barış Manço (1943–1999), Turkish rock musician
 Barış Örücü (born 1992), Turkish-German footballer
 Barış Özbek (born 1986), Turkish-German footballer
 Barış Tok (born 1978), Turkish motorcycle racer

Turkish masculine given names